Darniche is a surname. Notable people with the surname include:

Bernard Darniche (born 1942), French rally driver
Philippe Darniche (born 1943), French politician